Shekhovtsov is a Russian and Ukrainian surname.

 Anatoly Shekhovtsov (1930–2012), Ukrainian scientist in the area of internal combustion engines
 Anton Shekhovtsov (born 1978), Ukrainian academic
 Viktor Shekhovtsev (1940–2015), Soviet association football midfielder and Ukrainian coach.
 Volodymyr Shekhovtsov (born 1963), Ukrainian footballer and football manager
 Kirill Shekhovtsov (born 1998), Russian football player